Rammuka is a village in Rõuge Parish, Võru County, Estonia. Between 1991 and 2017 (until the administrative reform of Estonian municipalities) the village was located in Misso Parish.

References

External links 
Satellite map at Maplandia.com

Villages in Võru County
Estonia–Latvia border crossings